An HTTP server is a computer (software) program (or even a software component included in an other program) that plays the role of a server in a client–server model by implementing the server part of the HTTP and/or HTTPS network protocol(s).

An HTTP server waits for the incoming client requests (sent by user agents like browsers, web crawlers, etc.) and for each request it answers by replying with requested information, including the sending of the requested web resource, or with an HTTP error message.

An HTTP server may also have bindings to manage protocol extensions to HTTP (i.e. WebDAV, etc.) or messages of other protocols enveloped into HTTP messages (i.e. SOAP, etc.) in order to allow program-to-program communications.

Implementations of an HTTP server may vary in complexity, from a manageable tiny component to a full featured program implementation of HTTP and other protocols, which maybe can run in background, as one or more processes, etc.

An HTTP server can be found in any kind of computer, including embedded systems and super computers, also because it is a required component to run web interfaces (web applications), etc. 

The difference between the term web server and the term HTTP server is very subtle because the two terms are almost synonyms.

The first term (web server) somehow predates the second one and it refers to the purpose of serving web content in the context of a World Wide Web environment which is oriented to the interaction with human beings.  That term may refer not only to the HTTP server software component but also to the whole system (hardware and software) required to run a website.

The second term (HTTP server) has a technical origin bound to the software implementation of the server part of the protocol and so that term is used more to refer to it as a software component which can be used for many other purposes besides hosting public websites in Internet or even private websites in Intranets or Extranets.

See also

 Server (computing)
 Embedded HTTP server
 HTTPd
 Web server
 Comparison of web server software

References

External links
 Example: Apache, HTTP server project

Servers (computing)
Web server software